The 2005 FIA GT RAC Brno Supercar 500 was the seventh race for the 2005 FIA GT Championship season.  It took place on 28 August 2005 at the Motorsport Arena Oschersleben.

Official results

Class winners in bold.  Cars failing to complete 70% of winner's distance marked as Not Classified (NC).

Statistics
 Pole Position – #9 Vitaphone Racing Team – 1:22.991
 Fastest Lap – #6 GLPK-Carsport – 1:24.837
 Average Speed – 149.16 km/h

External links
 Official Results
 Race results

O
FIA GT